Chen Shuhua (born 20 May 1958) is a Chinese speed skater. She competed in the women's 1500 metres at the 1980 Winter Olympics.

References

External links
 

1958 births
Living people
Chinese female speed skaters
Olympic speed skaters of China
Speed skaters at the 1980 Winter Olympics
Place of birth missing (living people)
Sportspeople from Harbin